The 2001–02 NBA season was the Timberwolves' 13th season in the National Basketball Association. The Timberwolves were able to re-sign Joe Smith during the off-season, with Smith arriving from the Detroit Pistons, where he played the previous season. In addition, the team also signed free agent Gary Trent. The Timberwolves won nine of their first ten games, which led them to a 28–9 start as of January 15, but started to slow down a bit holding a 33–16 record at the All-Star break. Terrell Brandon sustained a knee injury after 32 games and was out for the remainder of the season, as the team suffered a 7-game losing streak in March. At midseason, the team traded Dean Garrett to the Golden State Warriors in exchange for second-year center Marc Jackson, and signed free agent Robert Pack in March. The Timberwolves finished third in the Midwest Division with a solid 50–32 record.

Kevin Garnett continued to establish himself as one of the top players in the NBA averaging 21.2 points, 12.1 rebounds, 5.2 assists and 1.6 blocks per game, and was named to the All-NBA Second Team, and to the NBA All-Defensive First Team. In addition, Wally Szczerbiak averaged 18.7 points per game, which was second on the team in scoring, while Chauncey Billups provided the team with 12.5 points and 5.5 assists per game, Brandon contributed 12.4 points, 8.3 assists and 1.6 steals per game, and Smith provided with 10.7 points and 6.3 rebounds per game. Garnett and Szczerbiak were both selected for the 2002 NBA All-Star Game. Garnett also finished in second place in Defensive Player of the Year voting.

However, in the Western Conference First Round of the playoffs, the Timberwolves lost to the Dallas Mavericks in three straight games, and losing in the opening round of the playoffs for the sixth straight season. Following the season, Billups signed as a free agent with the Detroit Pistons, while Pack was released to free agency, and veteran forward Sam Mitchell, who was the only member left from the team's inaugural season, retired.

Draft picks

Roster

Regular season

Season standings

z - clinched division title
y - clinched division title
x - clinched playoff spot

Record vs. opponents

Game log

Playoffs

|- align="center" bgcolor="#ffcccc"
| 1
| April 21
| @ Dallas
| L 94–101
| Chauncey Billups (25)
| Kevin Garnett (21)
| Chauncey Billups (9)
| American Airlines Center20,010
| 0–1
|- align="center" bgcolor="#ffcccc"
| 2
| April 24
| @ Dallas
| L 110–122
| Kevin Garnett (31)
| Kevin Garnett (18)
| Billups, Garnett (4)
| American Airlines Center20,084
| 0–2
|- align="center" bgcolor="#ffcccc"
| 3
| April 28
| Dallas
| L 102–115
| Kevin Garnett (22)
| Kevin Garnett (17)
| Kevin Garnett (5)
| Target Center18,795
| 0–3
|-

Player statistics

Regular season

Playoffs

Awards and records
 Kevin Garnett, All-NBA Second Team
 Kevin Garnett, NBA All-Defensive First Team

Transactions

References

See also
 2001-02 NBA season

Minnesota Timberwolves seasons
2001 in sports in Minnesota
2002 in sports in Minnesota
Monnesota